Leticia Calderón (born Carmen Leticia Calderón León on July 15, 1968) is a Mexican actress.

She lived in Alvarado, Veracruz, Guaymas, Sonora, La Paz and Mexico City, where she studied at the Centro de Capacitación de Televisa (Televisa Educational Training Centre).

She has taken part in several theatrical plays and telenovelas. One of her most popular roles was in Esmeralda, a telenovela which was very successful, especially in Eastern European countries.

Career
Calderón was born on July 15, 1968 in Guaymas, Sonora, Mexico.

1980s
In 1983, aged 14, Leticia made appearances in telenovelas such as Bianca Vidal, Amalia Batista, Principessa, El ángel caído, and Monte Calvario.

She started taking mature roles in 1986 with the telenovela El camino secreto as an antagonist.
Her first protagonist role was in 1987 when she starred in La indomable as María Fernanda Villalpando.

1990s
In the 90s, Leticia starred in a number of telenovelas such as Yo compro esa mujer, Valeria y Maximiliano, Entre la vida y la muerte and made special appearances in Prisionera de amor and Lazos de amor. 

In 1996 She would be cast as the main protagonist in the acclaimed telenovela La antorcha encendida where she plays the role of Teresa de Muñiz.

In 1997, she was a protagonist in Esmeralda alongside Fernando Colunga where she played blind.

In 1998, she made a special appearance in the telenovela El diario de Daniela.

In 1999, she starred as main heroine in Laberintos de pasión together with Francisco Gattorno and César Évora. She won the Premios TVyNovelas for Best Lead Actress for 2000 due to this role.

2000s
During 2000–2008, she withdrew from telenovelas to dedicate more time to her children, one of whom suffers from Down syndrome.

In 2003, she made a special appearance in Amor Real as Hanna de la Corcuera.

In 2006, she also had a special appearance in Heridas de amor as a younger version of the Nuria Bages character.

In 2008, Leticia participated in the series Mujeres asesinas, in the first episode of the show originally titled Sonia desalmanda next to Juan Soler and Grettel Valdéz.

In 2008, she starred as antagonist in En nombre del amor. She played the sister of Victoria Ruffo's character.

2010s
In 2011, she made a special appearance in Rosy Ocampo's La fuerza del destino as Alicia Villagómez, mother to younger version of David Zepeda's character.

In 2012, she worked in the telenovela Amor bravío, in which she played the antagonist together with Silvia Navarro, Flavio Medina, Cristian de la Fuente and César Évora. Due to her performance she won the "Best Female Antagonist" award at the 31st TVyNovelas Awards in 2013.

In 2015, she was confirmed to star in another Carlos Moreno production, A que no me dejas, alongside Arturo Peniche, Camila Sodi and Osvaldo Benavides.

Filmography

Films

Television

Awards and nominations

Premios TVyNovelas

Los Favoritos del Público

People en Español

Premios ACE

Galardón a los 30 grandes de TVyNovelas

Cocktail de la moda

Microfono de Oro

Premios Viktor (Slovenia)

References

External links

1968 births
Living people
Mexican telenovela actresses
Mexican film actresses
Mexican television actresses
Mexican stage actresses
20th-century Mexican actresses
21st-century Mexican actresses
Actresses from Sonora
People from Guaymas